Sophia Square or Sofia Square is a square in the center of Old Kyiv, Ukraine.  Located in the Shevchenkivskyi District of Kyiv, the square lies in front of Saint Sophia Cathedral, is bordered by Volodymyrska Street, and features a monument of Bohdan Khmelnytsky.

The city's Christmas and New Year's festivities have been held in this square since 2014, after they were moved from Maidan Nezalezhnosti due to the events of Euromaidan.

References 

Sophia Square
Shevchenkivskyi District, Kyiv
Squares in Kyiv
Volodymyrska Street